Cabragh may refer to the following places:
 Cabra Castle, a former castle and house and now hotel in County Cavan, Ireland
 Cabra, Dublin, Republic of Ireland; formerly spelt Cabragh
 Cabragh, County Down, a population centre in Northern Ireland
 Cabragh, County Tipperary, Republic of Ireland
 Cabragh (Killeeshil), a townland in County Tyrone, Northern Ireland
 Cabragh (Kilskeery), a townland in County Tyrone, Northern Ireland
 Threemilehouse, County Monaghan, Republic of Ireland; called "Cabragh" in the 2006 census.

Ancient sites:
Cabragh Ringfort, County Cavan
Cabragh Wedge Tomb, County Sligo